Chris Evert defeated Hana Mandlíková in the final, 6–3, 6–1 to win the women's singles tennis title at the 1982 US Open. It was her sixth US Open title, a joint Open Era record (shared with Serena Williams), and her 13th major singles title overall.

Tracy Austin was the defending champion, but lost in the quarterfinals to Mandlíková.

Seeds
The seeded players are listed below. Chris Evert is the champion; others show the round in which they were eliminated.

Hanika's position in the draw was taken over by ninth-seeded Bunge; in turn, Bunge's position was taken over by 17th-ranked Bonnie Gadusek.

Qualifying

Draw

Key
 Q = Qualifier
 WC = Wild card
 LL = Lucky loser
 r = Retired

Final eight

Earlier rounds

Section 1

Section 2

Section 3

Section 4

Section 5

Section 6

Section 7

Section 8

External links
1982 US Open – Women's draws and results at the International Tennis Federation

Women's Singles
US Open (tennis) by year – Women's singles
1982 in women's tennis
1982 in American women's sports